Senbere Teferi (born 3 May 1995) is an Ethiopian professional middle- and long-distance runner who competes mainly in the 1500 metres and cross country running. She was the silver medallist at the 2015 IAAF World Cross Country Championships. She represented her country at the 2013 World Championships and won medals on the track and World Youth and World Junior levels.

Career
Born Senbere Teferi Sora, she won her first international medal at the 2011 World Youth Championships in Athletics, placing second in the 1500 m to Kenya's Faith Kipyegon. She rose to the top of the national scene with a 1500 m win at the Ethiopian Athletics Championships. She took a prominent scalp in the form of Tiki Gelana at the Women First 5K in Addis Ababa in March 2012. At the 2012 World Junior Championships in Athletics she achieved a personal best of 4:08.28 minutes in the 1500 m final, but was again defeated by Kipyegon and also by Amela Terzić, leaving her with the junior bronze.

Senbere opened the 2013 season with a win at the national junior championships, taking the 3000 metres by a margin of nearly seven seconds. At the senior Ethiopian championships she made her debut over the 5000 metres and held off competition from Alemitu Heroye to lift her second national title. She began to move into cross country running at the end of the year and placed third in the junior section of the Ethiopian Clubs Cross Country Championships. The following year, she was among the favourites for the 2014 World Junior Championships in Athletics after a world-leading junior time of 8:41.54 minutes in the 3000 m at the Doha Diamond League, but ultimately did not compete. She scored an African junior record in the 2000 metres at the Golden Spike Ostrava meeting with a time of 5:34.27 minutes, finishing behind Genzebe Dibaba who was making an attempt at the world record.

Cross country was her focus after the track season. She won the Cross de l'Acier in France in November 2014. She was chosen for the senior Ethiopian team for the 2015 IAAF World Cross Country Championships and, in spite of her suffering an injury in the week before the event, she took to the front pack alongside Agnes Jebet Tirop and the two became the race protagonists, with Tirop eventually beating Senbere in the final 200 m, leaving the Ethiopian with the silver medal. Senbere's senior debut also saw her head the Ethiopian women to the team title, helped by her compatriot (and bronze medallist) Netsanet Gudeta.

International competitions

National titles
Ethiopian Athletics Championships
1500 metres: 2012
5000 metres: 2013

References

External links

Living people
1995 births
Ethiopian female long-distance runners
Ethiopian female middle-distance runners
World Athletics Championships athletes for Ethiopia
World Athletics Championships medalists
Athletes (track and field) at the 2016 Summer Olympics
Olympic athletes of Ethiopia
Athletes (track and field) at the 2020 Summer Olympics
21st-century Ethiopian women